Moylan James McDonnell (August 27, 1889 – January 22, 1969) was a Canadian hockey defenceman who played one season in the National Hockey League with the Hamilton Tigers in 1920–21. Prior to joining the Tigers he spent several years playing amateur hockey in New York City, and after retiring coached Princeton University for one season.

Playing career
Born in Stony Mountain, Manitoba, McDonnell would make a name for himself among amateur hockey clubs in New York. He played for the Brooklyn Crescents, New York Irish-Americans, New York Wanderers and the New York Hockey Club between 1909 and 1916. He served during World War I for the next three years and was signed as a free agent by the Hamilton Tigers in December 1920. He retired after his first NHL season.

After the NHL
In 1921–22 McDonnell coached the Princeton University Tigers ice hockey team in the intercollegiate circuit to a 3-6-1 (.350) record.

Not much is known about McDonnell (spelled MacDonell in US Immigration documents) except that he and his wife, Dorothy, lived in New York City, where Moylan was employed at the Federal Reserve Bank at least through 1942.

Career statistics

Regular season and playoffs

Awards and accomplishments
AHAA First All-Star Team (1914, 1915)
AAHL Second All-Star Team (1916)

Head coaching record

References

External links

1889 births
1969 deaths
Canadian ice hockey defencemen
Canadian military personnel of World War I
Canadian people of Irish descent
Hamilton Tigers (ice hockey) players
Ice hockey people from Winnipeg